The 1979 Horsham District Council election took place on 3 May 1979 to elect members of Horsham District Council in England. It was held on the same day as other local elections and the 1979 United Kingdom general election. The Conservatives retained control of the council with 33 seats, a majority of 12. The Independents had eight councillors elected, a decrease of three from last time. The Liberals gained a seat in Bramber & Upper Beeding and the Residents' association held on to their Henfield seat.

Council composition 

Prior to the election, the composition of the council was:

After the election, the composition of the council was:

Results summary

Ward results

Billingshurst

Bramber & Upper Beeding

Broadbridge Heath

Chanctonbury

Cowfold

Fowler S. was elected unopposed in Cowfold as an Independent in 1976, when this seat was last contested.

Denne

Forest

Henfield

Corp G. was elected in Henfield as a Conservative in 1976, when this seat was last contested.

Itchingfield & Shipley

Keen D. was elected unopposed in Shipley as an Independent in 1976.

Nuthurst

Pulborough & Coldwatham

Riverside

Roffey

Rudgwick

Rusper

Slinfold

Southwater

Charman M. Ms. was elected unopposed as an Independent in 1976, when this seat was last contested.

Steyning

Storrington

Sullington

Trafalgar

Warnham

West Chiltington

West Grinstead

References

1979 English local elections
May 1979 events in the United Kingdom
1979
1970s in West Sussex